Tangier was an American, Philadelphia-based hard rock band, which was active between 1984 and 1992.

Biography
Tangier formed in Philadelphia, Pennsylvania, United States, by the songwriter and guitarist Doug Gordon, and grew up in the clubs with bands such as Cinderella, who helped the group by having Tangier open for them on their second major tour.

Tangier's first, independent self-titled debut album, comprised Bill Mattson (vocals), Doug Gordon (guitar, songwriter), Rocco Mazzella (guitar, songwriter), Mike Kost (bass) and Mark Hopkins (drums).
After minor local success, Gordon decided to disband Tangier, and start fresh. He wrote new material and put together a new version of Tangier, utilizing only Mattson and Adam F Ferraioli from the previous lineup. Doug and Adam initially did the demo themselves later adding Bill and Tony R.on bass. Adam left to join Britny Fox whose drummer had died in a car crash, leaving Doug to then bring in Jimmy Drnec on drums. Gordon's competence as a rock lead guitarist was 'pro-filed' by Guitar World in its October 1989 issue, p. 118: "..... And on "Sweet Surrender," the album's tour de force. Gordon, after a growling 1-3-5 bass-note riff, launches into a dizzying, double tracked barn burner that suggests a summit meeting between Winter and Danny Gatton. This man can blaze." Garry Nutt was brought on board, as well as Gari Saint on guitar and Jimmy Drnec on drums. The band recorded demos and sought management and hooked up with Larry Mazer.
The band showcased for many labels and was finally signed by Derek Schulman, who was to head up the reborn and revamped Atco Records label. Veteran producer Andy Johns was selected for to produce Four Winds. Bobby Bender was secured for the drums prior to recording Four Winds. It produced the hit singles "On The Line" and "Southbound Train".

For their second major label album, Stranded, there were some line-up changes again. Separating with both Mattson and Saint, the band brought in vocalist–guitarist Mike LeCompt. This album produced the hit single "Stranded", featuring Pamela Anderson in its music video. The band fell apart in 1992.

Gordon, Lecompt and Nutt are the only former members still active in the music business. LeCompt has his own band that performs regularly in the greater Philadelphia area. Bassist Nutt has been involved with Arcade, Laidlaw, Davy Jones, Mike Tramp, Cinderella, Jean Beauvoir, Skinny Molly, Dave Hlubek, and  Mike Estes, and more recently toured with Chubby Checker. Gordon went on to co-produce, play sessions and write with other artists. He played guitar on Myles Goodwin's solo album, co-produced "I Just Can't Stop Lovin You" on Linear's 1992 album Caught in the Middle, and produced the Mojo's album Not for Nothin' ; plus he co-produced the Bakers Pink album (1993), and co-wrote "Babylon" on Tom Keifer's solo album That The Way Life Goes (2013).

Former members
Doug Gordon - guitar, backing vocals (1985-1992)
Bill Mattson - lead vocals (1985-1990)
Adam F Ferraioli  - drums (1985-1987)
Rocco Mazzella - guitar, backing vocals (1985-1986)
Mike Kost - bass guitar, backing vocals (1985-1986)
Mark Hopkins - drums (1985)
Garry Nutt - bass guitar, backing vocals (1986-1992)
Gari Saint - guitar, backing vocals (1986-1990) (died 2021)
Jim Drnec - drums (1987-1988)
Bobby Bender - drums (1989-1992)
Michael "Mike" LeCompt - lead vocals, guitar, keyboards (1991-1992)

Discography

Studio albums

Singles
"On The Line" - 1989 #67 US Hot 100
"Southbound Train" - 1989
"Stranded" - 1991

References

External links 
 Tangier website

1984 establishments in Pennsylvania
1992 disestablishments in Pennsylvania
Atco Records artists
Glam metal musical groups from Pennsylvania
Hard rock musical groups from Pennsylvania
Heavy metal musical groups from Pennsylvania
Musical groups established in 1984
Musical groups disestablished in 1992
Musical groups from Philadelphia